Portsmouth Fire Department No. 1, at 642 Seventh St. in Portsmouth, Ohio, was built in 1895.  It was listed on the National Register of Historic Places in 1987.

It is a two-and-a-half-story brick building, built on the site of Portsmouth's first fire station.  It operated as a fire station until 1977.

References

Fire stations on the National Register of Historic Places in Ohio
National Register of Historic Places in Scioto County, Ohio
Italianate architecture in Ohio
Fire stations completed in 1895
Portsmouth, Ohio